Ross Kemp on Gangs is a documentary series that was broadcast on Sky 1 from 21 September 2004, until 6 January 2009. Hosted by actor Ross Kemp, the series follows Kemp and a film crew around the world as they interview members of gangs, locals who have been affected by gang violence, and the authorities who are attempting to combat the problem. Kemp then tries to establish contact within the gangs in an attempt to talk to their leader. A total of four series were filmed, three of which have since been released on DVD. On 20 May 2007, the series won a BAFTA award for best factual series.

Production
The first series featured Kemp investigating gangs and police corruption in Brazil, Māori gangs in New Zealand, neo-Nazi skinheads in California and gangsters in London. The second series featured "MS13" from El Salvador, neo-Nazis in Russia, football hooligans in Poland, American "Bloods" and "Crips" gangs in St. Louis, and the "Numbers" gang in South Africa.

In the third series, Kemp travelled to Kingston, Jamaica, where gangs engage in bloody turf war; Poland, where football hooligans have become some of the most feared gangs in Europe; Colombia, where Kemp meets the people involved in bitter guerrilla fighting – including the most secretive of them all, the Sicarios; and travels to East Timor to meet the Sacred Heart and Seven Seven, two gangs in the midst of a deadly conflict.

In the fourth series, Kemp travelled to the Los Angeles district of Compton, to a neighbourhood where a famously hazardous scene was filmed, in which gangland junior Matt 'Malicious' Ward misfired his gun in a rival gang's neighbourhood. Kemp travelled to Bulgaria to investigate Roma gangs and Neo-Nazi Skinheads; Belize, where the focus was cocaine trafficking; and Liverpool, where Kemp met gangs in Norris Green and Croxteth.

In early 2007, Kemp published his experiences from the programme in a book of the same name. A second book was published in April 2009. In early 2009, the series aired in the United States on the Investigation Discovery channel under the title Gang Nation.

Episode list

DVD releases

Series 1 (2004-2006)

Series 2 (2006-2007)

Series 3 (2007)

Series 4 (2008-2009)

See also
Ross Kemp In Afghanistan shadows the first battalion Royal Anglians and offers insight into life on the front line with unprecedented access.
The Impressions Show with Culshaw and Stephenson a sketch usually featured at the end of the show.
in Afghanistan 2008–2012
in Search of Pirates 2009
Battle for the Amazon 2010
Ross Kemp: Extreme World since 21 February 2011.

References

External links
 

2004 British television series debuts
2009 British television series endings
Sky UK original programming
Television series by Endemol
Television series by Tiger Aspect Productions
English-language television shows